Cypress x Rusko is a collaborative extended play by American hip hop group Cypress Hill and British dubstep producer Rusko. The five track album was released on June 5, 2012 digitally and on August 14, 2012 on vinyl. It debuted at number 50 on the Top R&B/Hip-Hop Albums.

The EP produced two singles, "Roll It, Light It" and "Can't Keep Me Down" which features Damian Marley. On the amalgamation of the two styles of music, Sen Dog of Cypress Hill explains "I think dubstep is a natural progression of hip-hop... Especially the way that we formulated it with Rusko. There's definitely some roughness to it."

Track listing

Personnel 
 Chris Mercer - producer, mixing
 Louis Freese - vocals
 Senen Reyes - vocals
 Luca Pretolesi - mastering
 Frank Maddocks - art direction, design, photography
 Damian Marley - vocals (track 4)
 Demerick Shelton - vocals (track 5)

References

2012 EPs
Dubstep EPs
Cypress Hill albums
Rusko (musician) albums